"Love Is Killing Me" is the second single released by Dutch singer Do from her debut album, Do. It peaked at number seven on the Dutch singles chart.

Track listing
"Love Is Killing Me" 3.07
"Have I Told You Lately (live @ Radio538)" 4.21

Charts

Weekly charts

Year-end charts

References

2004 singles
Do (singer) songs
2004 songs
Songs written by Allan Eshuijs
Songs written by Tony Cornelissen